Cloudland is an unincorporated community in western Chattooga County in the U.S. state of Georgia. It is located at an elevation of 1,498 feet atop Lookout Mountain, a broad ridge that occupies northwestern Georgia and northeastern Alabama. The Girl Scouts' Camp Juliette Low, named for founder Juliette Gordon Low, is located just northeast of town.

History
Cloudland had its start in the late 19th century as a summer resort. The community was named after businessman A.C. Cloud. A post office was in operation at Cloudland from 1916 until 1981.

See also

References

External links

Unincorporated communities in Chattooga County, Georgia
Summer camps in Georgia (U.S. state)
Unincorporated communities in Georgia (U.S. state)